The Diocese of San Diego is a Latin Church ecclesiastical territory or diocese of the Catholic Church in Southern California, United States. Its ecclesiastical territory includes all of San Diego and Imperial Counties in Southern California, with a Catholic population of approximately 1.4 million.  The diocese is a suffragan diocese in the ecclesiastical province of the metropolitan Archdiocese of Los Angeles.

Leadership and religious institutes

On January 4, 2012, Bishop Cirilo Flores was appointed as coadjutor bishop with immediate right of succession to Bishop Robert Henry Brom, then already 75, who had served since January 1990. Bishop Brom had submitted his resignation when he turned 75, as all Roman Catholic bishops must, and Pope Francis accepted it on September 18, 2013, making Coadjutor Bishop Flores the Bishop of San Diego. Bishop Flores died on September 6, 2014 after a stroke and a battle with cancer. In March 2015, Pope Francis appointed Robert McElroy as the bishop of the diocese, and he was installed on April 15.  The pope named Bishop McElroy cardinal on 29 May 2022.
There are 233 priests, 118 active (not retired) deacons, 213 religious sisters and 30 religious brothers in the diocese.

History

The first Roman Catholic churches in the current territory of the Diocese of San Diego were two of the twenty-one "California Missions" (Mission San Diego de Alcala and Mission San Luis Rey de Francia). The area was first included in a diocese in 1840, with the creation of the Diocese of Both Californias (serving the entirety of the Mexican colonial provinces of Baja California and Alta California). After the conquest of Alta California by the United States, that diocese was divided, with the American portion becoming the Diocese of Monterey, later renamed the Diocese of Monterey-Los Angeles. In 1922, the diocese was again divided, with the southern portion becoming the Diocese of Los Angeles-San Diego.

The current diocese was created as a result of the division of the Diocese of Los Angeles-San Diego. The Diocese of San Diego was established on July 11, 1936, at which time it included San Diego County, Imperial County, Riverside County, and San Bernardino County; the remainder of the former diocese then became the Archdiocese of Los Angeles.

In 1978, the Diocese of San Diego was itself divided, with Riverside County and San Bernardino County becoming the Diocese of San Bernardino. 

Currently, the Diocese of San Diego includes 99 parishes and 16 missions, serving San Diego County and Imperial County.  In addition, the diocese includes 45 elementary schools, 5 high schools and 2 universities (University of San Diego and John Paul the Great Catholic University).

Clergy sexual abuse cases
On February 28, 2007, the diocese filed for bankruptcy protection after the diocese was unable to reach a settlement agreement with numerous plaintiffs suing over sexual abuse by clergy. On September 7, 2007, the diocese agreed to pay $198.1 million to settle 144 claims of child sexual abuse by clergy, the 2nd-largest settlement payment by a Roman Catholic diocese in U.S. history. Perpetrators included 48 priests and one lay coordinator of altar boys. In September 2018, eight more priests were added to this list.  On December 17, 2018, Juan Garcia Castillo, who served as a priest at St. Patrick Parish in Carlsbad, was convicted of sexual battery for inappropriately  touching a seminarian of his age and buying him alcohol at a local BJ's restaurants in Carlsbad, California, where he and the seminarian, together with another seminarian were having dinner.

On December 11, 2019, it was announced that four victims of convicted, and now deceased, sexual abuser Anthony Edward Rodrigue would sue the Diocese of San Diego. Their lawsuit began on January 2, 2020, along with 5 lawsuits targeting 5 other priests accused of child molestation and rape. Due to all these more recent allegations, the Diocese of San Diego and 5 other California Dioceses established in 2019 a fund for clergy sex-abuse victims; by September 2021 this compensation program had already paid another $24 million in claims.

Bishops

Bishops of San Diego
 Charles Francis Buddy (1936–1966)
 Francis James Furey (1966–1969, coadjutor bishop 1963–1966), appointed Archbishop of San Antonio
 Leo Thomas Maher (1969–1990)
 Robert Henry Brom (1990–2013, coadjutor bishop 1989–1990)
 Cirilo Flores (2013–2014, coadjutor bishop 2012–2013)
 Cardinal Robert W. McElroy (2015–present)

Auxiliary bishops
 Richard Henry Ackerman, C.S.Sp. (1956–1960), appointed Bishop of Covington
 John R. Quinn (1967–1971), appointed Bishop of Oklahoma City-Tulsa and later Archbishop of Oklahoma City and Archbishop of San Francisco
 Gilbert Espinosa Chávez (1974–2007)
 Salvatore J. Cordileone (2002–2009), appointed Bishop of Oakland and later Archbishop of San Francisco
 John P. Dolan (2017–2022) appointed Bishop of Phoenix
 Ramon Bejarano (2020–present)

Other priest of this diocese who became bishop
 Phillip Francis Straling, appointed Bishop of San Bernardino in 1978

Churches

High schools
 Academy of Our Lady of Peace, Normal Heights, San Diego, administered by the Sisters of St. Joseph of Carondelet
 Cathedral Catholic High School*, Carmel Valley, San Diego
 Mater Dei Catholic High School**, Chula Vista
 St. Augustine High School, North Park, San Diego, administered by the Augustinians
 Vincent Memorial Catholic High School, Calexico.

 * Formerly the University of San Diego High School
 ** Formerly Marian Catholic High School

See also

 Catholic Church by country
 Catholic Church hierarchy
 Chaldean Catholic Eparchy of Saint Peter The Apostle
 List of the Catholic dioceses of the United States

References

External links
 Roman Catholic Diocese of San Diego official website
 San Diego & Imperial Valley Catholic Schools
 Office for Evangelization and Catechetical Ministry
 Catholic Community Foundation of San Diego
 San Diego Office for Vocations
 San Diego Young Adult Ministries
 Catholic Charities, Diocese of San Diego

 
Churches in San Diego County, California
San Diego
Christian organizations established in 1936
1936 establishments in California
San Diego
San Diego
Companies that filed for Chapter 11 bankruptcy in 2007